Eumerus sabulonum is a species of hoverfly, from the family Syrphidae, in the order Diptera.

References

Diptera of Europe
Eristalinae
Insects described in 1817
Eumerini
Taxa named by Carl Fredrik Fallén